Atrocalopteryx atrocyana is a species of broad-winged damselfly in the family Calopterygidae.

The IUCN conservation status of Atrocalopteryx atrocyana is "NT", near threatened. The species may be considered threatened in the near future. The population is decreasing. The IUCN status was reviewed in 2011.

References

Further reading

 

Calopterygidae
Articles created by Qbugbot
Insects described in 1935